Astragalus deanei is a rare species of milkvetch known by the common name Dean's milkvetch, or Deane's milkvetch. It is endemic to southern San Diego County, California, where it grows on the slopes of the Peninsular Ranges between El Cajon and Tecate.

Description
Astragalus deanei is mostly hairless perennial herb growing erect to heights between 30 and 60 centimeters. The leaves are up to 18 centimeters long and are made up of oval-shaped leaflets with prominent midribs.

The open inflorescence holds up to 25 whitish flowers, each 1 to 1.5 centimeters long.

The fruit is an inflated legume pod 1.5 to 3 centimeters long which dries to a thin, papery texture. Its single chamber contains many seeds.

References

External links
Jepson Manual Treatment — Astragalus deanei
The Nature Conservancy
USDA Plants Profile
Sierra Club Profile (c.1994)
Astragalus deanei — U.C. Photo gallery

deanei
Endemic flora of California
Natural history of the California chaparral and woodlands
Natural history of the Peninsular Ranges
Natural history of San Diego County, California